Mick Peak is a peak rising to c. 1500 meters  west-northwest of Mount James in the Helicopter Mountains of the Saint Johns Range. Named by the Advisory Committee on Antarctic Names in 2007 after Robert Franz Mick, helicopter mechanic in support of the U.S. Antarctic Program at McMurdo Sound and the McMurdo Dry Valleys in eight austral field seasons, from 2000–01 to 2007–08.

References

Mountains of Victoria Land